"Diary of a Madman" is the debut single by the Gravediggaz, released in June 1994 from their debut album, 6 Feet Deep. The song was produced by members RZA (The Rzarector) and Prince Paul (The Undertaker) along with RNS and featured verses from Killah Priest and Scientific Shabazz. "Diary of a Madman" was Gravediggaz' most successful single, peaking at No. 82 on the Billboard Hot 100, their only single to reach the chart, as well as No. 8 on the Hot Rap Singles chart.

Background and composition
In an interview with HipHopSite.com, Prince Paul said that the sample looped in the song was produced by RNS. The story of the song is set in a courtroom, where a man possessed by evil spirits confesses to a murder and his story behind it, over a loop of haunting vocals.

Track listing

A-side
"Diary of a Madman" (album version) – 4:38  
"Diary of a Madman" (album clean version) – 4:37  
"Diary of a Madman" (no courtroom) – 4:05

B-side
"Constant Elevation" (album version) – 2:34  
"Constant Elevation" (radio clean version) – 2:31  
"Constant Elevation" (instrumental) – 2:31  
"Diary of a Madman" (instrumental) – 4:38

Charts

References

1994 songs
1994 debut singles
Gravediggaz songs
Song recordings produced by Prince Paul (producer)
Music videos directed by Hype Williams
Songs written by RZA
Song recordings produced by RZA